Josef Sedláček (15 December 1893 – 15 January 1985) was a footballer who appeared for both the Austria and Czechoslovakia national teams. He competed at the 1920 Summer Olympics and the 1924 Summer Olympics. On a club level, he played for AC Sparta Prague.

References

External links
 

1893 births
1985 deaths
Czech footballers
Czechoslovak footballers
Czechoslovakia international footballers
Austrian footballers
Austria international footballers
Olympic footballers of Czechoslovakia
Footballers at the 1920 Summer Olympics
Footballers at the 1924 Summer Olympics
AC Sparta Prague players
Place of birth missing
Association football forwards
Dual internationalists (football)